Miramare di Rimini (also known simply as Miramare) is a frazione (neighborhood) of Rimini, Italy. It is situated on the coast of the Adriatic Sea,  from the town center of Rimini. Miramare is equidistant between the town center and the nearby town of Riccione.

History 
In Roman times, the site of Miramare was located at the third mile post south of the Arch of Augustus, along the Via Flaminia (connecting Rimini and Rome). The ancient stone demarcating this location remains visible in the ground. Other stones near  comprising the original pavement of the Via Flaminia have also been discovered in excavations during the past decade.

Settlement outside the centers of Rimini and Riccione began in the mid-19th century, with the increase in popularity of bathing in the Adriatic. In the late 1880s, politician and visionary Sebastiano Amati conceived the development of the coastal region between Rimini and Riccione. In addition to the expansion of roads and the railroad in both town centers, he envisioned that Rimini and Riccione would be connected by a new road along the coast and new hotels would be built. Construction of this road began in the early 1900s, and by 1907, interest in expansion independently from Rimini grew. Around this time, c. 1905, the development and settlement of Miramare began; the modern hospital was constructed north of Miramare, and numerous hotels were built along the coast between Rimini and Riccione.

Tourism 
The Bologna–Ancona railway divides Miramare into two parts: while the area west of the railway is primarily residential, Miramare is located along the  beach and is a popular tourist destination, both for Italians and international travelers from across Europe.

Along the coast, there are numerous accommodations and recreational facilities for tourists. These include hotels, stores, restaurants, bars, discos, and arcades. Among these is the disco , which became well known across Europe by the 1980s. There are also many inexpensive two and three star hotels, which are popular among young travelers.

Transportation

Air 
Federico Fellini International Airport, serving Rimini, San Marino, and nearby regions, is located west of Miramare. It is one of the main gateways to tourism in Rimini and Riccione.

Rail 
Miramare is served by the Miramare railway station, a minor station on the Bologna–Ancona railway. It is served by around 15 regional trains per day; these services are operated by Trenitalia.

Public transportation 
Miramare is served by several bus routes. The Rimini–Riccione trolleybus, also known as line 11, runs regularly along the coast between Rimini's town center and Riccione, passing through Miramare.

References 

Rimini
Province of Rimini
Tourism in Italy